The Bruni Olympic .380 BBM is a blank firing revolver. It is banned in the UK as being "readily convertible" into a live-firing gun.

UK ban
The gun was banned on 4 June 2010 in the UK.  Increasing use of converted guns had led to the re-assessment of its categorisation as "not readily converted" to "readily converted", resulting in it becoming a prohibited weapon under section five of the Firearms Act 1968. A short amnesty between 14 April and 4 June was held in Dorset.

References

Revolvers
Gun politics in the United Kingdom
Starting pistols